Abkhazia and South Ossetia are disputed territories in the Caucasus. Most countries recognise them as part of Georgia, while Russia, Venezuela, Nicaragua, Nauru, and Syria regard them as independent. Russia's initial recognition of the independence of Abkhazia and South Ossetia occurred in the aftermath of the Russo-Georgian War in 2008. The government of Georgia considers the republics to be Russian-occupied territories.

Abkhazia and South Ossetia have been initially recognised by seven UN member states, until Tuvalu withdrew its recognition of both in 2014, while the status of Vanuatu's recognition of Abkhazia led to confusion between 2011 and 2015. Vanuatu reconfirmed in 2019 it does not support nor recognize the independence of Abkhazia, and supports Georgian territorial integrity including the two disputed territories. Georgia has severed diplomatic relations with the states recognising Abkhazia and South Ossetia, with Syria in 2019 being the most recent example. Abkhazia and South Ossetia recognise each other, and also have some recognition from non-UN member states.

History 

South Ossetia declared independence from Georgia during the 1991–1992 South Ossetia War on 29 May 1992, with its Constitution referring to the "Republic of South Ossetia". Abkhazia declared its independence after its war with Georgia in 1992–1993. Its Constitution was adopted on 26 November 1994.

Developments in 2008 
In April 2008, the United Nations Security Council unanimously passed Resolution 1808 that reaffirmed "the commitment of all Member States to the sovereignty, independence and territorial integrity of Georgia within its internationally recognised borders and supports all efforts by the United Nations and the Group of Friends of the Secretary-General, which are guided by their determination to promote a settlement of the Abkhaz–Georgian conflict only by peaceful means and within the framework of the Security Council resolutions."

The 2008 South Ossetia war was fought in August 2008 between Georgia on one side and South Ossetia, Abkhazia and Russia on the other, resulting in a combined South Ossetian, Abkhaz and Russian victory and the expulsion of the Georgian military from both territories. On 21 August 2008, rallies were held in Tskhinvali and Sukhumi at which the people of South Ossetia and Abkhazia, respectively, appealed to Russian President Dmitry Medvedev and the Russian Federal Assembly for official recognition of their independence as sovereign states. South Ossetian President Eduard Kokoity flew to Moscow on 23 August 2008 to address the Federation Council of Russia, and in his appeal stated "what the Georgian leadership has done in South Ossetia can only be described as a Caucasian Stalingrad." On 25 August 2008, President of Abkhazia Sergei Bagapsh also made a presentation to the Federation Council. In his address to the Council, Bagapsh stated "I can say for certain that Abkhazia and South Ossetia will never be [a] part of Georgia."

Russia's recognition 

After hearing the aforementioned appeals from both the Abkhazian and South Ossetian leadership, on 25 August 2008, the Federation Council and State Duma passed motions calling upon President Dmitry Medvedev to recognise the independence of both states and establish diplomatic relations.

On 26 August 2008, President Medvedev signed decrees recognising the independence of Abkhazia and South Ossetia as sovereign states, and made the following statement:

President Medvedev stated that "Western countries rushed to recognise Kosovo's illegal declaration of independence from Serbia. We argued consistently that it would be impossible, after that, to tell the Abkhazians and Ossetians (and dozens of other groups around the world) that what was good for the Kosovo Albanians was not good for them. In international relations, you cannot have one rule for some and another rule for others."

Russian Prime Minister Vladimir Putin noted previous Georgian aggression against Ossetia, and said "those who insist that those territories must continue to belong to Georgia are Stalinists — they stick to Yosif Visarionovich Stalin's decision", referring to the fact that it was Stalin, an ethnic Georgian, who gave the territory to the Georgian Soviet Socialist Republic, the predecessor of the modern day Georgian republic.

The Russian representative to NATO, Dmitry Rogozin stated that Russia's recognition of the independence of Abkhazia and South Ossetia is "irreversible" but called upon "NATO countries to withdraw and review their decision concerning Kosovo's independence" and subsequently "act on the premise that this is the new political reality."

In the UN Security Council, the United States was heavily critical of Russian support of the secessionist governments, accusing the government of violating Georgia's territorial integrity. In response, Vitaly Churkin, the Permanent Representative of Russia to the UN, attacked the U.S. claim to moral high ground by recalling its invasion of Iraq in 2003. Others accused the United States of hypocrisy, citing its support of the violation of Serbian territorial integrity when it recognised the independence of Kosovo in 2008.

The Russian government also welcomed Nicaragua's recognition of the two states, and called on other countries to "recognise reality" and follow Nicaragua's example. President Daniel Ortega announced that his government "recognises the independence of South Ossetia and Abkhazia and fully supports the Russian government's position." Medvedev also signed into law federal bills ratifying friendship, cooperation, and mutual assistance pacts between his government and those of Abkhazia and South Ossetia. The laws stipulated the obligations of each state to provide assistance to each other if either of them comes under attack, joint protection of Abkhazia and South Ossetia's borders, as well as cooperation on a wide range of economic, social, and humanitarian issues. The states would also jointly counter organised crime, international terrorism, and drug trafficking, documents to this effect were signed for 10 years with an option to extend the deal automatically.

Georgia's response 
Georgian President Mikheil Saakashvili considered Russia's move as an attempt to alter the borders of Europe by force. Below are some excerpts from his statement:

This is the first attempt on European territory ... since Hitler's regime and Stalin's Soviet Union where a large state is trying unilaterally, with the use of force, to completely crush a neighbouring country and openly annex its territory.
This is inconceivable lawlessness and insolence ... Russia has done unthinkable damage to its place in the international community.
The question of the re-establishment of the territorial integrity of Georgia and the protection of its freedom — this is not an internal Georgian problem, or a question of Georgia and Russia. This is now a question of Russia and the rest of the civilised world. Georgia's future, is not only the future of Georgia, this is the future of the whole civilised world...

Deputy Foreign Minister Giga Bokeria said, "This is an unconcealed annexation of these territories, which are a part of Georgia."

On 28 August, the Georgian Parliament passed a resolution declaring Abkhazia and South Ossetia "Russian-occupied territories" and instructed the government to annul all previous treaties on Russian peacekeeping. The following day the government announced that it was severing diplomatic ties with Russia, with the Georgian Embassy in Moscow and the Russian Embassy in Tbilisi to close as a result. Georgia recalled its Ambassador from Russia and ordered all Russian diplomats to leave Georgia, saying that only consular relations would be maintained. The Russian Ministry of Foreign Affairs commented on this decision, saying that some 600,000 to 1 million Georgians in Russia would be left to the "mercy of fate".

Later, Georgia also severed diplomatic relations with Nicaragua. Georgia moved to economically isolate the regions. A ban on economic activity in the regions without Georgian permission was issued, and anyone caught violating this ban by the Georgian authorities faced prosecution. The Georgian Navy blockaded the coast of Abkhazia, and has seized 23 cargo ships trying to bring supplies to Abkhazia, most notably fuel supplies. Abkhazia is dependent on fuel imports, and faced a serious shortage as a result. Russia began deploying boats from its own Black Sea Fleet on 21 September 2009, in response. In August 2009, Russia and South Ossetia accused Georgia of shelling Ossetian villages and kidnapping four South Ossetian citizens. Russia threatened to use force unless the shelling stopped, and put its troops stationed in South Ossetia on high alert.

Georgia criticised Nauru following the small island state's recognition of Abkhazia. Minister of Reintegration Temur Yakobashvili stated "The recognition of Abkhazia's independence by Nauru is more like a comedy ... it changes nothing on the international arena".

In January 2010, Georgia adopted a strategy regarding the reintegration of Abkhazia and South Ossetia. The strategy is called Involvement through Cooperation and it was presented to the international organisations as well as to Abkhazia and South Ossetia. The document says Georgia views peaceful methods as the only way for conflict solution and that there won't be a war with these regions. It envisions engagement of people of these two regions through education as well as social, economic and business projects, instead of isolation.

It is officially illegal under Georgian law to enter South Ossetia or Abkhazia through Russia, without permission from Georgia; it is possible to travel through Georgian territory to Abkhazia, though as Georgia cannot assure the safety inside the disputed territories, going to either Abkhazia or South Ossetia is not recommended by the Georgian government. It is not possible for foreigners to enter South Ossetia from Georgian controlled territory, as the South Ossetian de facto authorities do not facilitate nor allow this.

Western response 
The European Union, NATO, the OSCE, and the United States immediately voiced displeasure with Russia's decision.

Comparison

Comparisons with Kosovo 

The Assembly of the Serbian Autonomous Province of Kosovo and Metohija, under administration of the United Nations Interim Administration Mission in Kosovo since 1999, unilaterally declared independence as the Republic of Kosovo on 17 February 2008. The Republic of Kosovo was soon recognised by the United States and the EU three.

In an emergency session of the UN Security Council, Serbian President Boris Tadić asked the Council, "Are we all aware of the precedent that is being set and are we aware of the catastrophic consequences that it may lead to?" The Permanent Representatives of the United States, United Kingdom and France presented their opinion that the Kosovo case is sui generis in nature and could not be perceived as a precedent.

The setting of a precedent was mentioned by many countries. Among them were Argentina, and Cuba. India stated that Kosovo "can set a very dangerous precedent for similar cases around the world." The then Russian President Vladimir Putin described the recognition by Western powers of Kosovo independence as "terrible precedent, which will de facto blow apart the whole system of international relations, developed not over decades, but over centuries." He then went on to say, "They have not thought through the results of what they are doing. At the end of the day it is a two-ended stick and the second end will come back and hit them in the face."

In hearings before the United States House Committee on Foreign Affairs, California Republican Congressman and member of the Subcommittee on International Organizations, Human Rights, and Oversight, Dana Rohrabacher, compared the situation in Georgia to Kosovo.

"Now, we can talk until we are blue in the face, trying to say there is no analogy here, but it does not cover up the obvious analogy between Kosovo and what is going on in Georgia, where you have breakaway republics similar to what the Serbs faced. Now, the only difference is, of course, we are Americans, and they are Russians, and the people trying to break away there were pro-Russian.
Either we are for democracy, either we are for those people in Kosovo and in Ossetia and elsewhere and, I might say, in Georgia for their right to be separate from Russia, to begin with, and if we lose that, we have lost the high ground.
We are already losing our credibility right now. Let us not lose the high ground."

Some analysts at the time called ignoring Russian objections and the move by the United States and the EU-3 a mistake, with Ted Galen Carpenter of the Cato Institute stating that their view of Kosovo being sui generis and setting no precedent as "extraordinarily naïve". It was also suggested that Russia could use the case of Kosovo as pretext for recognising Abkhazia and South Ossetia or annexing Crimea in the future. The Heritage Foundation suggested that Kosovo is no precedent due to its administration by the United Nations as a protectorate for seven years and was blocked from being admitted to the United Nations due to Russia being able to use their veto in the United Nations Security Council.

In July 2008, in a speech to Russian Ambassadors on Russian foreign policy, Dmitry Medvedev opined that "for the European Union, Kosovo is almost what Iraq has proved to be for the United States" and that they acted unilaterally in pursuit of their own self-interests and undermined international law in the process.

Latvian newspaper Diena on 28 August 2008 argued that Medvedev's decree was "a blow below the belt" for Russia's ally Serbia. "If the changes in Abkhazia and South Ossetia occurred, as Russia claims, in accordance with the example set in Kosovo, then that means that Russia has indirectly admitted that Kosovo's departure from Serbia was lawful."

In September 2009, Russian Permanent Representative to the United Nations, Vitaly Churkin, when asked by journalists why Abkhazia and South Ossetia should be internationally recognised and Kosovo not, said that "the strongest argument is the fact that at the time when Kosovo's authorities made the UDI, nobody was threatening them or putting them in a position where they had to secede. On the contrary, Belgrade even went so far as to refrain from exerting any military or economic pressure on Pristina."

In October 2009, Dmitry Medvedev said that parallels between Kosovo and South Ossetia are "inappropriate". "We are categorically against drawing parallels between the Balkan events and the events in the Caucasus," he said. "As concerns South Ossetia – it's our unambiguous, absolutely clear position – it about repelling direct military aggression. And what was done by Russia after that, was done in full accordance with the UN Charter." He said that Kosovo's unilateral declaration of independence and the events that followed "have confirmed the inadequacy of attempts to adjust the solution of complex international problems to considerations of notorious political expediency." "We consider it unacceptable to do what was done in the Kosovo precedent – to use the lack of progress at negotiations as the reason for unilateral actions, including recognition of new international legal entities," the Russian president said.

As a precedent in other disputes 
On 18 September 2008, Russian foreign minister Sergey Lavrov summarised and explained Russia's position in relation to the other two frozen conflicts in the former Soviet Union, the Nagorno-Karabakh Republic and Transnistria, both de facto independent republics seeking international recognition.

He went on to give the following explanation for this position:

Nagorno-Karabakh 

The French Ambassador to Armenia Serge Smessoff commented that "the events in Georgia have changed the regional situation, and therefore we hope that there will arise the possibility of rapid solution to the Karabakh conflict."

In Armenia the five political parties (the Union "Constitutional Right", the Democratic Party of Armenia, the United Communist Party of Armenia, the Christian-Democratic Union of Armenia and the Union "National Self-Determination") welcomed the recognition of Abkhazia and South Ossetia by the Russian Federation. The Union "Constitutional Justice" stated in a declaration that "today an unprecedentedly favourable situation for the international recognition of the Nagorno Karabakh Republic has come to a head, and Armenian diplomacy does not have the right to delay" and "What Armenian and Karabakh diplomacy could not do in 17 years, Russia has done in 20 days." The declaration went on to say that "in case of the conflicts which have arisen on post-Soviet space, the thesis of territorial integrity cannot be a method for solving the conflicts. On the contrary, the continued reiteration of this thesis can lead the conflict to military confrontation, and all of the consequences that entails."

The Armenian President Serzh Sargsyan, however, stated that Armenia will not formally recognise Abkhazia and South Ossetia as independent states any time soon, but reiterated his support for their residents’ right to self-determination. He said that Armenia will not recognise them "for the same reason that it did not recognize Kosovo's independence. Having the Nagorno-Karabakh conflict, Armenia can not recognize another entity in the same situation as long as it has not recognized the Nagorno-Karabakh Republic."

Secretary of the opposition party Heritage Stepan Safaryan expressed the opinion that the recognition of Abkhazia and South Ossetia by Armenia would be dangerous as it could damage Armenia's sole stable way to communicate with the outside world – through Georgia.

Transnistria

The then president of the unrecognised state of Transnistria Igor Smirnov said that "the Russian leadership, in recognising the independence of Abkhazia and South Ossetia, has underlined the priority of the expression of the will of the people for solution of such problems".

On 25 August, the day before Russia's recognition, Dmitry Medvedev met with President of Moldova Vladimir Voronin, where the Russian leader made it clear that Moscow is ready to solve the Transnistria conflict within the framework of the sovereignty of the Republic of Moldova with the maximum effort. Relations between Moldova and Transnistria worsened after Moldova refused to support the independence of Abkhazia and South Ossetia.

Within Russia 
According to a declaration addressed to the Council of Europe by Russian human rights activists, "the situation in the North Caucasus republics has become greatly more agitated since the war between Russia and Georgia in the South Caucasus." In Ingushetia, Ingush opposition activist, Magomet Khasbiyev in an interview with radio station Ekho Moskvy called for Ingushetia to separate from Russia, saying that "We must ask Europe or the US to separate us from Russia." He also said "If we aren't acceptable to this country, we don't know what else we should do."

President Dmitry Medvedev did not express concerns about possibility of renewed separatist sentiments in the North Caucasus and believed such scenarios could only arise from foreign countries. In an interview with Euronews he said that he did not "see any such dangers so long as the people from abroad do not meddle in these affairs, thinking up various scenarios for dismembering Russia."

Separatism 
Georgian justice minister Nika Gvaramia claimed that “this will have very serious political consequences for Russia." "We will overcome this crisis, I am sure; but what is Russia going to do with its own state – in respect of separatism, which is still a problem in Russia; I'm not worried much about it, but I am sure that it will lead to a total collapse of Russia if not today, tomorrow, for sure," he told journalists.

Various arguments 
Following the Russian recognition of South Ossetia, Swedish Minister for Foreign Affairs Carl Bildt stated, "South Ossetian independence is a joke. We are talking about a smugglers' paradise of 60,000 people financed by the Russian security services. No one can seriously consider that as an independent state."

When asked about UN resolutions that supported Georgia's territorial integrity, Permanent Representative of Russia to the United Nations Vitaly Churkin claimed that "Their use of force against South Ossetia clearly dashed all those previous resolutions and created a completely new reality." However, France's deputy UN ambassador Jean-Pierre Lacroix argued that "there is no way you can “dash” or “cancel” or whatever “terminate” a resolution of the Security Council by force."

Andrey Illarionov, former advisor to Vladimir Putin, argued that recognition of Abkhazia will legitimize the ethnic cleansing and apartheid. He also cited several differences between Kosovo and Abkhazia as the reasons why Abkhazia should not be granted recognition. In Kosovo the ethnic cleansing was carried out by Serbs – the opponents of secession; In Abkhazia it was committed by the secessionists. While the right of return of refugees to Kosovo was a precondition for self-determination, in Abkhazia the self-determination is linked with the refusal to allow the return of internally displaced people. Abkhaz separatists rejected several peace plans proposed by Georgia, the United Nations, and Germany; while in Kosovo it was Serbia that rejected peace efforts. After the war, Kosovo was ruled by U.N. administration; while Abkhazia denies international organizations entry.

Stephen F. Jones argued that while South Ossetia was seeking for union with Russia, the political realities of the South Caucasus made this an unlikely prospect. In the 2012 presidential elections, Alla Dzhioyeva, an opposition representative had victory snatched from her by the South Ossetian Supreme Court. This illustrated the region's limited political autonomy, which was underlined by the unchallengeable presence of the Russian military. That court decision supported the contention that South Ossetia is a not a real state, but a Russian vassal. South Ossetia's borders are controlled by Russia. There is no South Ossetian foreign policy. South Ossetia does not have the functions of a state to provide for its citizens. There is little popular support for independence.

Other events 
Abkhazia said it would not take part in the "Geneva Talks on Security and Stability in the Caucasus" in June 2010 because of concerns over the objectivity of the co-chairmen who were representatives of the UN, the EU, and OSCE. A spokesman said "Our proposals are being ignored, discussions on the non-renewal of war are being procrastinated, instead secondary questions are being discussed. Thereupon we feel the co-chairmen have no real proposals, and we want to give them time till September to prepare a document, concerning security, and acceptable for all sides. The Geneva discussions are necessary, and it is normal that each party voices its position, but the mediators must be neutral and non-biased. But the mediators fail to conduct discussions in a constructive impartial manner."

Positions taken by states

States formally recognising Abkhazia or South Ossetia as independent

UN member states

Partially recognized states

Former partially recognized states

States that recognised Abkhazia or South Ossetia as independent, but subsequently withdrew recognition

UN member states

States that do not recognise Abkhazia or South Ossetia as independent

UN member states

Other states

Positions taken by intergovernmental organisations 
Under international law, intergovernmental organisations do not themselves possess the legal capacity to recognise any state diplomatically; their member states do so individually. However, depending on the intergovernmental organisation's rules of internal governance and the positions of their member states, they may express positive or negative opinions as to declarations of independence, or choose to offer or withhold membership to a newly declared state.

Positions taken by non-state actors

Regions with independent governments

International non-governmental organisations

See also 

 International reaction to the Russo-Georgian War
 International recognition of the Donetsk People's Republic and the Luhansk People's Republic
 List of states with limited recognition
 2006 South Ossetian independence referendum
 Proposed Russian annexation of South Ossetia

Notes

References 

2008 in Georgia (country)
Russo-Georgian War
Politics of Georgia (country)
Abkhazia–Russia relations
Russia–South Ossetia relations
Georgia (country)–Russia relations
Foreign relations of Abkhazia
Foreign relations of South Ossetia
2008 in Abkhazia
2008 in South Ossetia
Abkhazia and South Ossetia
Articles containing video clips
Abkhazia–South Ossetia relations